The Lexington Historic District is a national historic district located at Lexington, Virginia. It includes Greek Revival, Queen Anne, "Picturesque Cottage", and other architecture. Notable buildings include Washington Hall located on the campus of Washington and Lee University, the Virginia Military Institute, Court House, Presbyterian Manse, Halestones, and The Castle. Located in the district are the separately listed Alexander-Withrow House, Barracks, Virginia Military Institute, the Stonewall Jackson House, Lee Chapel, Lexington Presbyterian Church, Reid-White-Philbin House, and Stono.

It was listed on the National Register of Historic Places in 1972.

Gallery

References

External links
 
 
 
 
 
 
 

Historic American Buildings Survey in Virginia
Historic districts on the National Register of Historic Places in Virginia
Greek Revival architecture in Virginia
Queen Anne architecture in Virginia
Buildings and structures in Lexington, Virginia
National Register of Historic Places in Lexington, Virginia